Hahnstätten is a former Verbandsgemeinde ("collective municipality") in the Rhein-Lahn-Kreis, in Rhineland-Palatinate, Germany. Its seat was in Hahnstätten. On 1 July 2019, it was merged into the new Verbandsgemeinde Aar-Einrich.

The Verbandsgemeinde Hahnstätten consisted of the following Ortsgemeinden ("local municipalities"):

 Burgschwalbach 
 Flacht 
 Hahnstätten
 Kaltenholzhausen 
 Lohrheim 
 Mudershausen 
 Netzbach 
 Niederneisen 
 Oberneisen 
 Schiesheim

Former Verbandsgemeinden in Rhineland-Palatinate
Rhein-Lahn-Kreis